An intermezzo is a musical composition which fits between other musical or dramatic entities, such as acts of a play or opera, or movements of a larger musical work.

Intermezzo may also refer to:

Music
 intermedio, an Italian spectacle with music and dance 
 Intermezzo (Strauss), an opera by Richard Strauss premiered in 1924
Intermezzo in modo classico, Mussorgsky
Intermezzo, organ composition by Jehan Alain (1911-1940)
Intermezzo, organ composition by Herbert Sumsion (1899-1995)
 "Intermeco", national anthem of Bosnia and Herzegovina
 "Intermezzo No. 1", an ABBA instrumental track from their 1975 self-titled album
 Intermezzo (album)
 "Intermezzo", a song by the Sword from the 2017 album Used Future

Theatre, film and television
 InterMezzo (play), a 1933 play by Jean Giraudoux
 Intermezzo (1936 film), a 1936 Swedish language film starring Ingrid Bergman and Gösta Ekman
 Intermezzo (1939 film), a 1939 English language remake of the 1936 film starring  Ingrid Bergman and Leslie Howard

Other uses
 Intermezzo (chess), a chess tactic, more commonly called a Zwischenzug
 InterMezzo (file system), a file system for Linux
 Intermezzo (zolpidem tartrate), a prescription medication used for the treatment of insomnia associated with "early awakening"
 Intermezzo (horse), a thoroughbred racehorse